D.I.G.  may refer to:
Deputy Inspector General, a high ranking senior police officer in several countries
Dinosaur Interplanetary Gazette, founded July 4, 1996, was a pioneering online science magazine
Directions In Groove, Australian acid jazz band